White Slave may refer to:

White Slave (film), a 1985 Italian horror film
The White Slave (1927 film), a German silent film
The White Slave (1939 film), a French drama film
White Slaves (film), a 1937 German film directed by Karl Anton
The White Slave (TV series), a 2016 Colombian telenovela
White Slave, a 2007 autobiography by Marco Pierre White
The White Slave, an 1882 play by Bartley Campbell

See also
White slavery (disambiguation)